Yipma (pronounced as Hipma) is an Angan language of Papua New Guinea. Dialects are Wantakia, Baruya (Barua), Gulicha, Usirampia (Wuzuraabya).

History
'Baruya' refers to the accent of the Bruwa tribe, currently residing around the Marawaka station area. The original tribe that had been in Marawaka is the Anzii tribe. They are now located at the foot of Mount Yelia in three villages: Wauko, Ande and Mala.

The Baruwa tribe were refugees, from somewhere in the Meniyamiya area of Morobe province, who had been driven out of their land in a tribal war, the Anzii while still in Marawaka peacefully took them in. After some time, tribal war broke out between the Anzii tribe and the Baruwa tribe and the Anzii tribe moved out from Marawaka to where they are now. Thus, "Baruya" is not a dialect but an accent, but 'Hipma' is more acceptable to speakers of other dialects.

Dialects
Usirampia is another accent of the Hipma language, but it is mixed up with another language called Bulekiye. It sounds more like Hipma though there are some Bulekiye influences in it. The Anzii tribe speaks the pure version of the Hipma language and there are no influences from other languages because they were surrounded by enemy tribes from the time they were relocated until the arrival of whitemen and did not make many contacts outside their landmarks.

Bibliography
Lloyd, Richard G. 1989. Bound and Minor Words in Baruya. Ukarumpa: SIL-PNG.
Lloyd, Joy A. 1992. A Baruya-Tok Pisin-English Dictionary. Canberra: Pacific Linguistics.

References

Angan languages
Languages of Morobe Province